Ernst Fivian (12 August 1931 – 15 December 2021) was a Swiss gymnast who competed in the 1952 and 1960 Summer Olympics. Fivian died on 15 December 2021, at the age of 90.

References

External links
 

1931 births
2021 deaths
Swiss male artistic gymnasts
Olympic gymnasts of Switzerland
Gymnasts at the 1952 Summer Olympics
Gymnasts at the 1960 Summer Olympics
Olympic silver medalists for Switzerland
Olympic medalists in gymnastics
Medalists at the 1952 Summer Olympics
20th-century Swiss people